Stella de Heij (born 17 January 1968 in Driehuis) is a former field hockey goalkeeper from the Netherlands, who played eighteen international matches for her national team.

De Heij was a member of the Dutch Women's Team that, under the guidance of coach and former international Tom van 't Hek, won the bronze medal at the 1996 Summer Olympics, after defeating Great Britain on penalty strokes in the bronze medal game. In Atlanta, Georgia she was the stand-in for first choice goalie Jacqueline Toxopeus.

References 

 KNHB Profile

External links
 

1968 births
Living people
Dutch female field hockey players
Female field hockey goalkeepers
Field hockey players at the 1996 Summer Olympics
Medalists at the 1996 Summer Olympics
Olympic field hockey players of the Netherlands
Olympic medalists in field hockey
People from Velsen
Olympic bronze medalists for the Netherlands
Sportspeople from North Holland
20th-century Dutch women
21st-century Dutch women